This is a list of episodes of Wishbone, which aired on PBS Kids from October 8, 1995, to December 7, 1997.

Series overview

Episodes

Season 1 (1995)

Season 2 (1997)

TV movie (1998)

References

Lists of American children's television series episodes